The German National Library of Science and Technology, abbreviated TIB, is the national library of the Federal Republic of Germany for all fields of engineering, technology, and the natural sciences. It is jointly funded by the Federal Ministry of Education and Research (BMBF) and the 16 German states. In addition to acquiring scientific literature, it also conducts applied research in such areas as the archiving of non-textual materials, data visualization and the future Internet. The library is also involved in a number of open access initiatives. With a collection of over 9 million items in 2017, the TIB is the largest science and technology library in the world.

Collection 
The TIB acquires literature in all engineering fields as well as architecture, information technology, chemistry, mathematics, physics and other basic sciences. It is a particular specialist in the acquisition of "gray literature"; that is, literature difficult to obtain and not available via the standard book or journal trade. It also holds a large number of standards, norms, patents, source data, scientific conference proceedings, government research papers and dissertations. Special collections include the "Albrecht Haupt Collection" of digitally rendered architectural drawings and a regional focus on technical literature from East Asia and Eastern Europe. The film and audiovisual material held previously by IWF Knowledge and Media is now held by TIB.

In 2011 its holdings were:

 8,900,000 books, journal titles, and digital items
 5,500,000 books
 3,400,000 micro-materials
 78,000 individual digital documents (E-Books, E-Dissertations)
 46,000 E-journals
 17,000 specialized journals (print)
 3,500 specialized databases
 15,750,000 patent documents, norms, and standards

The physical collection occupies  of shelving.

Services

DOI Registration Agency 
In 2005 the TIB became the world's first Digital Object Identifier (DOI) registration agency for research data sets in the fields of technology, natural sciences and medicine. Today it offers registration for the results of any publicly funded research conducted in Europe.

Depository library 
The TIB is a legal deposit library for research projects sponsored by various agencies of the German Federal Government, in particular:

 Federal Ministry of Education and Research (BMBF)
 Federal Ministry of Economics and Technology (BMWi) in the areas of energy, aviation, and aerospace research
 Federal Ministry for the Environment, Nature Conservation and Nuclear Safety (BMU) in energy research and energy technologies
 Agency for Renewable Resources (FNR) on behalf of the Federal Ministry of Food, Agriculture and Consumer Protection (BMELV)

Leibniz Open Access Repository 
The TIB is a member of the Leibniz Association, a consortium of 87 non-university research institutes in Germany. In support of the Association's open access goals, the TIB operates the Leibniz Open Access Repository in cooperation with Leibniz Institute for Information Infrastructure (formerly ). The TIB advises the Leibniz Association's various member organizations, scientists and staff on depositing publications in the repository according to open access guidelines.

Competence Center for Non-Textual Material 
The amount, usage and importance of non-textual materials such as 3D models, AV media and research data is continually increasing and only a small proportion can be searched at the present time. The goal of the TIB Competence Centre for Non-Textual Materials (abbreviated to KNM) is to fundamentally improve access to, and the use of, such non-textual materials. The TIB also develops new multimedia analysis methods such as morphology, speech or structure recognition to create indexing and metadata to help researchers and educators make better use of these complex materials. In addition, the competence center is dedicated to the preservation of multimedia objects, the assignment of DOI, and knowledge transfer.

GetInfo online service 
TIB operates the GetInfo portal for science and technology with interdisciplinary search capabilities for the other German National Libraries as well as access to more than 150 million data sets from other specialized databases, publishers and library catalogs. The TIB also makes scientific videos of lectures, conferences, computer animations, simulations and experiments available via GetInfo. These video items can be searched free-of-charge and can be downloaded via Flash Player.

Partnerships 
The TIB partners with a variety of national and international libraries, institutions and associations.

Goportis library network
The TIB is one of three partners in the Leibniz Library Network for Research Information consortium Goportis, the others being the German National Library of Economics (ZBW) and German National Library of Medicine (ZB MED). This initiative develops and operates online search services, online full-text delivery services, licensing agreements, non-textual materials, document preservation efforts, data storage, and open access.

Institutional partners
The TIB is also the scientific information provider for researchers in the newly independent states of the former Soviet Union, including Azerbaijan, Georgia, Kazakhstan, Kyrgyzstan, Tajikistan and the Ukraine. It also collaborates with numerous organizations in China, Japan and Eastern Europe. Notable institutional partnerships include:
 Chinese Academy of Sciences, Beijing
 DataCite e.V.
 German Physical Society (DPG)
 Library of the Delft University of Technology (TU), Delft, Netherlands
 State Scientific and Technical Library of Ukraine (SSTL), Kyiv, Ukraine
 Online Computer Library Center (OCLC), Ohio, United States
 Russian Academy of Natural Sciences, Moscow, Russia
 Russian National Public Library for Science and Technology (GPNTB), Moscow, Russia
 Swiss Federal Institute of Technology Zurich, Zürich, Switzerland

Other partners
 International Association of Technological University Libraries

Research projects 
As part of the German national research infrastructure, the TIB conducts its own applied research, particularly in the field of information science. In cooperation with a variety of other institutions, these projects focus on the areas of visual searching, data visualization, the Semantic Web, and the Future Internet.

PROBADO 3D
PROBADO is a project to develop tools for the automatic indexing, storage and delivery of non-textual documents such as 3D models. Its goal is to enable academic libraries to deal with multimedia objects just as easily as with textual information. Tools include searching by intuitive drawing in 2D and 3D and delivery of results while drawing. For this initiative the TIB partnered with the Technical University of Darmstadt, the University of Bonn and the Technical University of Graz. It is funded by the DFG.

Visual access to research data
This project, funded by the Leibniz Association, is a joint effort of the TIB, the GRIS Darmstadt (Interactive Graphics Systems at the Technical University of Darmstadt) and the IGD (Fraunhofer Institute for Computer Graphics). It deals with developing approaches to the interactive, graphical access to research data in order to make it easily represented and searchable. The project is tasked with developing methods for data analysis, visual search systems, metadata-based searching and prototype implementation.

SCOAP3-DH
SCOAP3 (Sponsoring Consortium for Open Access Publishing in Particle Physics) is a global consortium of organizations in high energy physics, physics research centers and leading international libraries. Its goal is to convert essential journals in particle physics that are presently financed by subscriptions into open access journals with the support of the publishers. SCOAP3-DH is funded by the German Research Foundation, working in cooperation with the German Electron Synchrotron (DESY) and the Max Planck Society (MPS).

Other research projects 
Additional TIB research projects include:
 arXiv-DH: development the Open Access platform arXiv for German universities and other institutions
 DP4lib: development of a reusable and flexible infrastructure for digital preservation
 Knowledge Exchange: a national initiative in Germany to extend the use of information and communications technology in research and teaching
 KomFor: a Center of Expertise for Earth and Environment research data
 Linked Heritage: metadata, standards, persistent identification and linked data systems for digital cultural heritage in Europe
 STI Adaptations to Mobile Web Devices: approaches for enhancing access to STI through mobile devices
 TIB-Transfer: development and implementation of a concept for the commercialization of research results
 ViFaChem II: development of concepts and tools for the Virtual Library of Chemistry II

See also 
 German National Library
 German National Library of Economics
 German National Library of Medicine
 List of libraries in Germany

References

External links 

 

Libraries in Germany
Scientific organisations based in Germany
Libraries established in 1959
1959 establishments in Germany
Buildings and structures in Hanover
University of Hanover
Research libraries in Germany
Deposit libraries
Science libraries